is a single by Not Yet. It reached number-one in the Oricon Weekly Chart and number-one in the Japan Hot 100 chart.

References

2011 debut singles
Oricon Weekly number-one singles
Japanese-language songs
Not Yet (band) songs
Billboard Japan Hot 100 number-one singles
Nippon Columbia singles